Schlatbach is a river of Brandenburg, Germany. It is a tributary of the Stepenitz, which it joins near Lübzow.

See also
List of rivers of Brandenburg

Rivers of Brandenburg
Rivers of Germany